Auguste Rateau (13 October 1863 – 13 January 1930) was an engineer and industrialist born in Royan, France, specializing in turbines.

Biography
After studies, first at the École Polytechnique and then at the École des Mines de Paris, he began his career as a teacher at the École des Mines de Saint-Étienne from 1888 to 1897.

He then embarked on an industrial career exploiting turbines. He manufactured fans for mines, blowers for steel mills, water pumps, and steam turbines for ships. To this end, he created a design office in Paris and, in 1903, the Société pour l’exploitation des appareils Rateau, which moved in 1917 to La Courneuve where he opened a factory two years later. The company has since been integrated into Alstom, and La Courneuve's premises are still operated by GE Power Service. This entity manages the maintenance of turbomachines, turbo-pumps and turbocompressors installed on nuclear, thermal and industrial sites in France and in some parts of the world.

In 1928 he founded the Association Française de Normalisation, the French national organization for standardization, and served as president.

Rateau was a Commander of the Legion of Honour and a member of the French Academy of Sciences.

1863 births
1930 deaths
People from Royan
20th-century French engineers
20th-century French inventors
Steam turbines
Turbines
Members of the French Academy of Sciences
École Polytechnique alumni
Commandeurs of the Légion d'honneur
Mines Paris - PSL alumni